Gretel Beer (born Margaret Weidenfeld; 11 July 1921 – 11 August 2010) was an Austrian-born English author of cooking books and travel reports. She also served as a cookery writer for The Daily Telegraph and Daily Express newspapers.

Biography
Beer was born in Vienna into a Jewish family. She was mostly raised by her aunt Olga Springer (Bechin, Bohemia 1879–1942 Maly Trostenets extermination camp) the widow of a physician (in 1937: 9th district, Porzellangasse 45), as her mother Regina Weidenfeld née Pisk died when Margaret was six years old and her father, Dionys (Duny) Weidenfeld, did not keep up a household. (At Porzellangasse, until 1938 Eric Pleskow and Ari Rath spent their childhood, as they told the Austrian broadcaster ORF in 2012.) After attending primary school at Marchegg, a small town east of Vienna near the border with Slovakia, she attended a federal Realschule at Vereinsgasse in Vienna's 2nd district, where many Jewish Viennese lived.

In the spring of 1938, after the annexation of Austria by Germany, she and 48 other pupils were forced to leave this school and attend a Jewish class elsewhere in Vienna. At the entrance hall of her school, which is now called Bundesrealgymnasium Vereinsgasse, since 1989 the names of the expelled pupils are displayed on a memorial inscription.

Her father managed to emigrate to England and arranged for her to leave the Third Reich with a Kindertransport arranged by British NGOs. In March 1939 she arrived in Harwich and worked in several professions in England. In 1943 she married Dr Johann (Hans) Beer, son of the lawyer Oskar Beer. Hans had studied law at the Vienna University until 1938 and finished his studies in England. He was later able to work as British lawyer. The couple later lived in an apartment at Gray's Inn in London and in a manor house in Deal, Kent.

She worked in advertising and public relations, and after the war she was successful with her cookery books and her journalistic work, e.g. for the Daily Telegraph and Vogue. She travelled to Austria at least once a year and kept the typical Viennese German useful to describe the secrets of Viennese cuisine. Her husband died in 1981 in their manor house, during a fire which he could not escape in his wheelchair. She died in Deal in 2010.

Works
Ice Cream Dishes, 1952
Sandwiches for Parties and Picnics, 1953 
Classic Austrian Cooking, 1954
The Diabetic Gourmet, 1974 (German edition: Feinscheckerküche für den Diabetiker)
Austrian Cooking and Baking, 1975
Exploring Rural Austria, 1990
Eating Out in Austria, 1992
A Little Hungarian Cookbook, 1993
The QE2 Cookbook, 1999
Austria
Austrian Cooking
The Sunday Express Cookbook
Wieden (Polish for Vienna), by Fred Mawer, Gretel Beer, Deirdre Coffey, Rosemary Bircz, Caroline Bugler; Hachette Polska, Warsaw, 2009

References

1921 births
2010 deaths
Jewish emigrants from Austria to the United Kingdom after the Anschluss
English Jewish writers
20th-century English writers
The Daily Telegraph people
Women cookbook writers
British women editors
20th-century English women writers
Kindertransport refugees
Jewish women writers
20th-century English businesspeople